Parliamentary elections were held in Montenegro, at the time a constituent republic of Federal Republic of Yugoslavia on November 3, 1996, the same day as the first round of the 1996 Serbian local elections. The result was a victory for the ruling Democratic Party of Socialists which won 45 of the 71 seats.

Electoral system
Of the 71 seats in Parliament, 64 were elected by proportional representation in a nationwide constituency and seven were elected in a special constituency for minority lists. The electoral threshold was set at 6% and seats allocated using the d'Hondt method. Closed lists were used with a single list for both constituencies, although parties only had to award half their seats according to the order of the list, with the remaining half free for them to allocate.

Contesting parties

Results

References

External links
Narodna sloga election campaign rally in Tuzi, October 1996 (Slavko Perović speech)
Narodna sloga election campaign rally in Danilovgrad, October 1996 (Miro Vicković speech)
Narodna sloga election campaign rally in Danilovgrad, October 1996 (Slavko Perović speech)
Narodna sloga election campaign rally in Pljevlja, October 25, 1996
Narodna sloga election campaign rally in Pljevlja, October 25, 1996 (Slavko Perović speech)
DPS election campaign rally in Danilovgrad, October 25, 1996
DPS election campaign rally in Ozrinići, October 1996 (Milo Đukanović speech)
DPS election campaign rally in Bijela, October 1996 (Svetozar Marović speech)
SDP election campaign rally in Mrkojevići, October 26, 1996 (Ranko Krivokapić, Dragiša Burzan, and Žarko Rakčević speeches)
Partija prirodnog zakona TV presentation, October 1996 (Saša S. Petrović speech)

Elections in Montenegro
Montenegro
Parliamentary
Elections in Serbia and Montenegro
Montenegro